This is a list of Ministers of Health of Russia.

Russian Empire

Chief Manager of Public Health (Minister-level)

Russian SFSR

People's Commissioners/Ministers of Health

Russian Federation

Ministers of Health (1991–1994)

Ministers of Health and Medical Industry (1994–1996)

Ministers of Health (1996–2004)

Ministers of Health and Social Development (2004–2012)

Ministers of Health (since 2012)

External links
Ministry of Health official website

Lists of government ministers of Russia
Lists of government ministers of the Soviet Union